Amaurobius kratochvili is a species of spider in the family Amaurobiidae, found in Croatia and Albania.

References

kratochvili
Spiders of Europe
Spiders described in 1938